Eugene Cocreham (November 14, 1884 – December 27, 1945) was a former Major League Baseball pitcher. He played three seasons with the Boston Braves from 1913 to 1915.

References

External links

Boston Braves players
Major League Baseball pitchers
Galveston Sand Crabs players
San Antonio Bronchos players
Topeka Jayhawks players
Toronto Maple Leafs (International League) players
Kansas City Blues (baseball) players
Shreveport Gassers players
San Antonio Bears players
Baseball players from Texas
People from Luling, Texas
1884 births
1945 deaths
Manhattan Elks players
Beeville Orange Growers players